Ratsch an der Weinstraße (Slovene: Račane) is a former municipality in the district of Leibnitz in the Austrian state of Styria. Since the 2015 Styria municipal structural reform, it is part of the municipality Ehrenhausen an der Weinstraße.

Geography
Ratsch lies in south Styria on the Slovenian border.

References

Cities and towns in Leibnitz District